Circassians in Jordan are Circassians living in Jordan. Circassian refugees arrived in Jordan in the late 19th century, after being exiled during the Circassian genocide in the 1860s and later the Russo-Turkish War (1877–1878). They settled in Jordan, then a part of Ottoman Syria, in and around Amman and Jerash. Circassians are credited with founding modern Amman as the city had been previously abandoned.

History

Exodus
Circassians began entering the Ottoman Empire en masse during the expansion of the Tsarist Russian Empire into their Caucasian homeland during the 1850s. An 1860 agreement between the Ottomans and the Russians mandated the immigration of 40,000–50,000 Circassians into Ottoman territory. However, between 800,000 and 1,200,000 Muslim Circassians entered and settled in the Ottoman Empire, of whom some 175,000 were resettled by the government in the Empire's predominantly Christian Balkan territories in 1864. The Balkan Crisis of 1876, which led to the Russo–Turkish War of 1877–1878, was partly attributed to the killings of Bulgarian Christians by Circassian settlers. During the subsequent Russian occupation of Bulgaria and Eastern Rumelia the Circassians were expelled from the Balkans, which was formalized by the Treaty of Berlin in 1878. Coinciding with the crisis in the Balkans, further waves of Circassians and Chechens from the Caucasus and Turkmens from Central Asia were fleeing Russian rule and becoming refugees in eastern Anatolia.

Settlement in Transjordan
With Ottoman territories decreasing and tens of thousands of refugees overcrowding the cities of Anatolia, Thrace and Macedonia, the imperial government resolved to resettle refugees along the peripheral areas of the Levantine provinces. The policy of establishing Circassian agricultural communities in grain-producing regions in Syria Vilayet was partly motivated by the Empire's loss of its key agricultural region, the Balkans. It was also driven by Ottoman efforts to centralize control over the Empire, which included attempts to sedentarize the nomadic Bedouin of the Syrian steppe and impose control over the practically autonomous Druze, Alawite and Maronite communities of the coastal mountain ranges; the settlements of the Circassians, along with other migrant communities such as the Kurds, Assyrians and Armenians were strategically located to serve as a buffer between the dissident communities. In 1878, 50,000 Circassians were transported by sea to the Levantine coast from Constantinople, Salonica and Kavalla. From there about 25,000 were sent to the southern parts of Syria Vilayet, mainly the Balqa (part of modern Jordan), the Golan Heights and the area around Tiberias. Their transportation and settlement came under the supervision of the Damascus-based governor. Four piasters per taxpayer were levied toward financing the immigration committees charged with settling the Circassians and others. The Circassians were initially housed in schools and mosques until their resettlement. Numerous migrants died in transit from disease and poor conditions.  

The Ottoman authorities assigned lands for Circassian settlers close to regular water sources and grain fields. Between 1878 and 1884, three Circassian villages were founded in areas of modern Jordan: Amman (1878) and Wadi Sir (1880) in the Balqa and Jerash (1884) in Jabal Ajlun, while a Turkmen village called al-Ruman (1884) was also established. Amman had been abandoned during the 14th century and the settlement of the Circassians there marked the founding of the modern town. The first group of Circassians belonged to the Shapsug dialect group and they were joined later by Circassians belonging to the Kabardia and Abzakh groups. During a second major wave of migration in 1901–1906, which also included many Chechen refugees from the Caucasus, five mixed Circassian and Chechen settlements were founded: Naour (1901), Zarqa (1902), Russeifa (1905), Swaylih (1905) and Sukhna (1906), all located in the vicinity of Amman. The new migrants also settled in the villages founded during the first migration wave. Amman experienced a decline from 500 settlers to 150 in the first three months after its founding due to its inhospitable conditions. Those who remained initially lived in caves and among the site's Roman-era ruins and were highly exposed to typhoid, malaria, and typhus. By 1893 new arrivals boosted the population to around 1,000.

The lands on which the Circassians were settled had traditionally served as winter campgrounds for Bedouin tribes who lacked deeds. The Bedouin and the townspeople of Salt viewed the Circassians as beneficiaries and agents of the government due to the land grants and exemptions from taxes for a ten-year period they received and the service many took up with the Ottoman Gendarmerie. The Circassians refused to pay the khuwwa (protection fees) solicited by the Bedouin, which entailed a portion of their harvest to the tribes in return for the tribes' "protection". The mutual hostility between the Circassians and their nomadic and settled Arab neighbors led to clashes. Despite the superiority of Bedouin arms and mobility, the Circassians maintained their positions and were feared by the Bedouin and the Salt townspeople, who blamed them for a number of killings.  

The Circassians in the Balqa proved an integral component in the expansion of government control in the historically autonomous southeastern Levant. For the government, the Circassian settlers served the dual role as a periodic militia used against local rebellions and a key factor in the integration of the local economy through agricultural production, grain transportation, the construction and protection of the Hejaz Railway and service in local administrative bodies. The Circassian town of Amman grew rapidly after the construction of the Hejaz Railway, operational in central Transjordan since 1903, which also brought investment from Salti, Damascene, and Nabulsi merchants. As their numbers increased, the Circassians became a major local power and a number of pacts were formed with the Bedouin, including a mutual defense alliance with the Bani Sakhr in the late 1890s. The alliance proved instrumental in the Bani Sakhr's intervention in the 1906–1910 conflict between the Circassians and the Balqawiyya tribal confederation. The Circassian, Chechen and Turkmen settlements solidified the new sedentarized order taking place in the Balqa, which also included Salt and Karak townspeople and Bedouin tribesmen establishing their own agricultural and satellite villages. Two new roads linking Jerash and Amman were built via al-Ruman and Swaylih respectively to accommodate the settlers' ox-drawn carts, while secondary roads were built connecting Amman to its satellite Circassian and Chechen villages. Circa World War I there were 5,000–6,000 Circassians in Transjordan.

Post-Jordanian independence
As Amman has experienced exponential growth and urbanization since Jordan's independence, the Circassian proportion of the city's population currently stands at about 5%. Most Circassians in Jordan formed part of the country's urban middle class. They largely work in the government bureaucracy and military and are given significant representation in Jordan's parliament and executive branch.

Culture and identity
The Circassian settlers mainly spoke the Adyghe dialects of Kabardian, Shapsug, Abzakh and Bzhedug, but there were also Abkhazian and Dagestani language speakers. Historically Circassians identified themselves as "Adyghe" while the term "Circassians" was historically used by outsiders, such as Turks, Arabs, Russians and Europeans. Today the diaspora communities, including the Jordanian Circassians, use both terms interchangeably. The group's cultural identity in Jordan is mainly shaped by their self-images as a displaced people and as settlers and Muslims. Beginning in the 1950s, Circassian ethnic associations and youth clubs began holding performances centered on the theme of expulsion and emigration from the Caucasus and resettlement in Jordan, which often elicited emotional responses by Circassian audiences. Eventually the performances were made in front of mixed Circassian and Arab spectators in major national cultural events, including the annual Jerash Festival of Arts. The performances typically omit the early conflicts with the indigenous Arabs and focus on the ordeals of the exodus, the first harvests and the construction of the first Circassian homes in Jordan. The self-image promoted is of a brave community of hardy men and women that long endured suffering.

In 1932 Jordan's oldest charity, the Circassian Charity Association, was established to assist the poor and grant scholarships to Circassians to study at universities in Kabardino-Balkaria and the Adygea Republic. The Al-Ahli Club, founded in 1944, promoted Circassian engagement in sports and social and cultural events in Jordan and other countries, while the establishment of the Folklore Committee in 1993 helped promote Circassian traditional song and dance. Today, an estimated 17% of the Circassian community in Jordan speak Adyghe. 

Political representation:

Circassians, together with Chechens, are mandated 3 seats in the Jordanian parliament. However, Circassians also produce a disproportionate amount of ministers, which some Jordanians regard as an unofficial Quota.

Notable people

 Sa'id Mufti, 9th prime minister of Jordan
 Ismael Babouk, first mayor of Amman
 Emanne Beasha, singer
 Toujan al-Faisal , politician and human rights activist, first female member of the Jordanian parliament
 Hashem Akhagha, The first MMA champion in the middle east, under the Desert Force Organization. 
 Ahmad Husni Hatuqey, Current general of the General Intelligence Directorate (Jordan).
 Major General Ibrahim Pasha Othman Kashoqa – 1st commander of the Royal Jordanian Air Force (1956–1962)
 Hero of Samu Incident Lieutenant General Ihsan Pasha Shurdom −9th commander of the Royal Jordanian Air Force (1983–1993), his Hawker Hunter Jet Fighter still presented in the entrance of the Martyr's Monument in Amman, Jordan
 Major General Awni Pasha Belal −10th commander of the Royal Jordanian Air Force (1993–1994)
 Major General Kheiredin Hakouz Bghane, former commander of the royal special forces
 Major General Hussein Pasha Ahmad Shodash-Shapsugh – 16th commander of the Royal Jordanian Air Force (2006–2010)
 Major General Mansour Pasha Hakouz Bghane-Shapsugh- commander of southern region – Commander of central Region Military Attache in Moscow – Russia – General Inspector of Jordanian Army
 Major General Izzat Pasha Qandour −9th commander of the Jordanian public security directorate (1969–1970)
 Lieutenant General Anwar Pasha Mohammed −12th commander of the Jordanian public security directorate (1971–1976)
 Major General Mamoun Pasha Khalil Ha'opsh −14th commander of the Jordanian public security directorate (1979–1981)
 Lieutenant General Mohammad Pasha Idris Dodokh −15th commander of the Jordanian public security directorate (1981–1984)
 Lieutenant General Thyab Pasha Yousef −16th commander of the Jordanian public security directorate (1984–1985)
 General Tahseen Pasha Shordum −22nd commander of the Jordanian public security directorate (2002–2004)
 General Tareq Pasha Ala'Eddin Berzeg −7th commander of the Jordanian General Intelligence Department.
 Mohydeen Izzat Quandour – Writer, intellectual, film producer and director, and musician
 Amjad M. Jaimoukha – One of the most influential Circassian writers and publicists. His books include: The Circassians: A Handbook (RoutledgeCurzon: London and New York, 2001), The Chechens: A Handbook (Routledge: London and New York, 2005), Circassian Culture and Folklore (Bennett and Bloom: London, 2010), Parlons tcherkesse: dialecte kabarde (L'Harmattan: Paris, 2009).
 Hana Hussien Naghawi – first woman to be awarded a professor's position in civil engineering in Jordan.

See also
Circassian diaspora
Circassians in Syria

References

Bibliography

Further reading

 
Circassians' Special Niche in Jordan : 'Cossacks' Seem out of Place in Arab Palace Los Angeles Times. 17 May 1987.
The Circassians in Jordan at circassianworld.com.
Maintenance of the Circassian language in Jordan

Circassian diaspora in Asia
Ethnic groups in Jordan
Circassian diaspora
Ethnic groups in the Middle East